The 1991–92 West Virginia Mountaineers men's basketball team represented West Virginia University as a member of the Atlantic-10 Conference during the 1991-92 season. The team played their home games at WVU Coliseum in Morgantown, West Virginia. Led by 14th-year head coach Gale Catlett, the Mountaineers received an at-large bid to the 1992 NCAA tournament as the No. 12 seed in the East region.

Roster

Schedule and results

|-
!colspan=9 style=| Regular Season

|-
!colspan=9 style=| Atlantic-10 Tournament

|-
!colspan=9 style=| NCAA Tournament

References

West Virginia
West Virginia Mountaineers men's basketball seasons
West Virginia Mountaineers men's basketball
West Virginia Mountaineers men's basketball
West Virginia